Dênis Marques do Nascimento or simply Dênis Marques (born February 22, 1981 in Maceió), is a retired Brazilian football striker.

Club statistics

Flamengo career statistics
(Correct )

according to combined sources on the Flamengo official website.

Santa Cruz career statistics

Honours

Individual
 Brazilian Cup Top Scorer: 2007

Club
Atlético Paranaense
 Paraná State League: 2005

Flamengo
 Brazilian Série A: 2009

Santa Cruz
 Pernambuco State League: 2012, 2013
 Campeonato Brasileiro Série C: 2013

References

External links
 

  CBF
  furacao
  rubronegro
  atleticopr
  ipcdigital

1981 births
Living people
People from Maceió
Brazilian footballers
Brazilian expatriate footballers
Expatriate footballers in Kuwait
Club Athletico Paranaense players
Brazilian expatriate sportspeople in Kuwait
Mogi Mirim Esporte Clube players
Brazilian expatriate sportspeople in Japan
CR Flamengo footballers
Santa Cruz Futebol Clube players
ABC Futebol Clube players
Expatriate footballers in Japan
Campeonato Brasileiro Série A players
Campeonato Brasileiro Série B players
J1 League players
Omiya Ardija players
Association football forwards
Kuwait SC players
Sportspeople from Alagoas